The white-throated pewee (Contopus albogularis) is a species of bird in the family Tyrannidae.
It is found in Brazil, French Guiana, and Suriname.
Its natural habitat is subtropical or tropical moist lowland forests.

References

white-throated pewee
Birds of the Guianas
white-throated pewee
Taxonomy articles created by Polbot